Aciagrion approximans, Indian violet dartlet, is a species of damselfly in the family Coenagrionidae. It is found in east and south of India. The range extends to Thailand, China and Cambodia.

Subspecies
Fraser considered the specimen found in northeast as Aciagrion approximans and in south as Aciargion hisopa race krishna. A recent study revealed that the subspecies krishna found in south is not conspecific with A. hisopa and found to be very close to A. approximans found in northeast; but differing at the level of subspecies.

Aciagrion approximans approximans (Northeast India)
Aciagrion approximans krishna (Western Ghats)

Description and habitat
It is a small, slim, slender damselfly with violet and black colors. Its thorax is black with lateral violet stripes. Segments 2 to 7 of the abdomen are black on dorsum and violet in the ventral half. Segments 8 and 9 are violet without any marks. Segment 10 is black on dorsum.  The lower half of segment 8 is marked with black in A. a. krishna. Female is similar to the male; but paler in colors. Segments 8 and 9 are black and 10 is blue on dorsum.

It breeds in ponds, lakes or in slow moving streams.

See also
 List of odonates of India
 List of odonata of Kerala

References

External links

Coenagrionidae
Insects of India
Insects described in 1876